Louis Antoine Jean Le Bègue de Presle Duportail (14 May 1743 – 12 August 1802) was a French military leader who served as a volunteer and the Chief Engineer of the Continental Army during the American Revolutionary War. He also served as the last Secretary of State for War and first Minister of War during the beginning of the French Revolution.

Early life and education 
Louis Lebègue Duportail was born in 1743 at Pithiviers, France. He graduated from the royal engineer school at Mézières in 1765.

Military career 
Promoted to lieutenant colonel in the Royal Corps of Engineers, Duportail was secretly sent to America in March 1777 to serve in Washington's Continental Army under an agreement between Benjamin Franklin and the government of King Louis XVI of France. He was appointed colonel and chief engineer of the Continental Army, July 1777; brigadier general, November 17, 1777; commander, Corps of Engineers, May 1779; and major general, November 16, 1781.

Duportail participated in fortifications planning from Boston, Massachusetts to Charleston, South Carolina, where he was captured following the surrender of the city in May 1780, and helped Washington evolve the primarily defensive military strategy that wore down the British Army.  Subsequently exchanged, he also directed the construction of siege works at the Battle of Yorktown, site of the decisive Franco-American victory of the Revolutionary War.  During the encampment at Valley Forge in late 1777 and early 1778, his headquarters was at Cressbrook Farm.

Returning to France in October 1783, Duportail became an infantry officer and in 1788 a Marechal-de-Camp (brigadier general).  He served as France's minister of war from November 16, 1790, through December 7, 1791, during the beginning of the French Revolution and promoted military reforms.  Forced into hiding by radical Jacobins, he escaped to America and bought a farm near Valley Forge, Pennsylvania.  He lived there until 1802, when he died at sea while attempting to return to France.

Notes 
This article contains public domain text from

Footnotes

References

Further reading

External links

 Duportail House
 

1743 births
1802 deaths
18th-century French politicians
Continental Army generals
French Army officers
French people of the American Revolution
Military personnel from Orléans
People who died at sea
Secretaries of State for War (France)
United States Army Corps of Engineers Chiefs of Engineers
Politicians from Orléans